Joe Frazer Field is an athletic field in Newark, Delaware that was used for the University of Delaware's baseball, track and field, football and tennis teams. The stadium was dedicated on June 18, 1913. The field's construction was made possible through a large memorial donation by the parents of Joseph Heckart Frazer, a 1903 graduate of Delaware College.

The very first Fightin' Blue Hens football game at Frazer Field occurred on October 18, 1913 when Delaware beat visiting Temple 28–0. The Blue Hens played their final game at Frazer Field on October 26, 1946, when they defeated Drexel 52–0 en route to their first National Championship.

The university installed a new Field Turf surface in September 2010.

References

1913 establishments in Delaware
American football venues in Delaware
Athletics (track and field) venues in Delaware
Baseball venues in Delaware
College tennis venues in the United States
College track and field venues in the United States
Defunct athletics (track and field) venues in the United States
Defunct college baseball venues in the United States
Defunct college football venues
Defunct sports venues in Delaware
Delaware Fightin' Blue Hens baseball
Delaware Fightin' Blue Hens football
Delaware Fightin' Blue Hens men's tennis venues
Delaware Fightin' Blue Hens women's tennis venues
Delaware Fightin' Blue Hens track and field
Buildings and structures in Newark, Delaware
Sports venues in Delaware
Tennis venues in Delaware